Wharite Peak is a mountain at the southern end of the Ruahine Range,  north of Woodville in the Manawatū-Whanganui region of New Zealand. The mountain is home to the main television and FM radio transmitter for the city of Palmerston North and the wider Manawatu region.

Transmitter

A 1 kW television transmitter was established atop Wharite in 1963, relaying WNTV1 from Wellington. It was replaced with a 100 kW transmitter in 1966. In 2013 the first digital television transmitters were installed.

Television frequencies

Radio frequencies

Former analogue television frequencies 
The following frequencies were used until 29 September 2013, when Wharite switched off analogue broadcasts (see Digital changeover dates in New Zealand).

References

Mountains of Manawatū-Whanganui
 
Radio in New Zealand